Dream Eater may refer to:

 Dream Eater, a race of beings in the Universe of Kingdom Hearts
 Dream Eater, a forthcoming EP by Y2K and bbno$
 Dream Eater, a song by For the Fallen Dreams on their 2014 album Heavy Hearts

See also
Dream Eater Merry, a Japanese manga series